Chester's International, known as Chester's or Chester's Chicken, is a fried chicken quick-service restaurant chain based in Birmingham, Alabama, United States. W.O. Giles founded Chester's in October 1965 and adopted Chester the Chicken as the emerging foodservice company's mascot, named for the Chester Goode character on Gunsmoke, a favorite TV show of Giles'. In late 2012, the company moved its headquarters to the Birmingham suburb of Mountain Brook, Alabama.

Locations 
The company began franchising its concept in July 2004 and has grown to in-line locations in shopping plazas and mall food courts. According to Entrepreneur, the chain has more than 1,098 locations worldwide.
 Monmouth County, NJ
 Downtown Memphis, TN

Gallery

See also
 List of chicken restaurants

References

External links
Chester's International

Companies based in Birmingham, Alabama
Restaurants in Birmingham, Alabama
Restaurants established in 1965
Fast-food poultry restaurants